Ramūnas Navardauskas (born 30 January 1988) is a Lithuanian professional road racing cyclist, who rides for UCI Continental team .

Career

During the 2012 Giro d'Italia, Navardauskas finished sixth in the opening individual time trial; twenty-two seconds shy of American Taylor Phinney. In stage four's team time trial,  were victorious, and Navardauskas took the race lead. He became the first Lithuanian to wear the pink jersey. However, Navardauskas lost the jersey to Italian Adriano Malori on stage six. In April 2015, Navardauskas won the Circuit de la Sarthe by a single second over Manuele Boaro, winning the race for the second consecutive year.

In September 2017 Navardauskas had a successful heart surgery for a cardiac arrhythmia.

Personal life
Born in Šilalė, Navardauskas currently resides in Oliva, Valencian Community, Spain.

Major results
Source: 

2005
 1st  Time trial, National Junior Road Championships
 10th Time trial, UCI Junior World Championships
2006
 6th Time trial, UCI Junior World Championships
2007
 National Road Championships
1st  Road race
4th Time trial
 7th Tartu GP
 9th Overall Olympia's Tour
2008
 4th Time trial, National Road Championships
 4th Tallinn–Tartu GP
 5th Mayor Cup
 9th Riga Grand Prix
 10th Overall Szlakiem Walk Majora Hubala
2009
 3rd Time trial, National Road Championships
2010
 1st Liège–Bastogne–Liège Espoirs
 National Road Championships
2nd Road race
3rd Time trial
 4th Overall Boucles de la Mayenne
1st Stage 3
 4th Ronde van Vlaanderen Beloften
 5th Overall Ronde de l'Isard
1st Stage 2
 7th Paris–Roubaix Espoirs
2011
 National Road Championships
1st  Road race
2nd Time trial
 1st Stage 2 (TTT) Tour de France
 3rd Overall Ster ZLM Toer
 7th Overall Circuit de la Sarthe
2012
 National Road Championships
1st  Time trial
3rd Road race
 1st Stage 4 (TTT) Giro d'Italia
 2nd Overall Danmark Rundt
 8th Road race, UCI Road World Championships
 8th Overall Tour of Qatar
1st  Young rider classification
1st Stage 2 (TTT)
 8th Overall Tour of Oman
2013
 1st Stage 11 Giro d'Italia
 1st Stage 2 Tour de Romandie
 3rd Time trial, National Road Championships
2014
 National Road Championships
1st  Time trial
4th Road race
 1st  Overall Circuit de la Sarthe
1st Stage 4
 1st Stage 19 Tour de France
 3rd Grand Prix Cycliste de Québec
 4th Overall Tour of Alberta
1st  Points classification
 4th Grand Prix Cycliste de Montréal
2015
 National Road Championships
1st  Time trial
2nd Road race
 1st  Overall Circuit de la Sarthe
 3rd  Road race, UCI Road World Championships
 3rd GP Ouest–France
 4th Overall Bayern–Rundfahrt
2016
 1st  Road race, National Road Championships
 4th Trofeo Felanitx-Ses Salines-Campos-Porreres
 6th GP Industria & Artigianato di Larciano
 7th Overall Ster ZLM Toer
 8th Trofeo Playa de Palma
2017
 7th Overall Vuelta a San Juan
1st Stage 3 (ITT)
2018
 1st  Overall Tour of Black Sea
1st  Mountains classification
1st Stage 1
 National Road Championships
2nd Road race
2nd Time trial
 2nd Overall Baltic Chain Tour
 3rd Overall Tour of Cappadocia
1st  Points classification
2019
 National Road Championships
1st  Road race
3rd Time trial
2020
 10th Overall La Tropicale Amissa Bongo

Grand Tour general classification results timeline

References

External links

Cycling Base: Ramūnas Navardauskas
Cannondale-Garmin: Ramūnas Navardauskas

1988 births
Living people
Lithuanian male cyclists
Cyclists at the 2012 Summer Olympics
Cyclists at the 2016 Summer Olympics
Olympic cyclists of Lithuania
Lithuanian Giro d'Italia stage winners
Lithuanian Sportsperson of the Year winners
People from Šilalė
2014 Tour de France stage winners
European Games competitors for Lithuania
Cyclists at the 2019 European Games